Ali Shar may refer to:

 A character in One Thousand and One Nights; see List of One Thousand and One Nights characters#Ali Shar
 Ali Shar, Iran, a village in Markazi Province, Iran